Patrick Joseph Hickey (3 September 1871 – 4 February 1946) was an Australian rules footballer who played with Fitzroy in the early days of the Victorian Football League (VFL).

A centre half-back, Hickey played for Fitzroy in the Victorian Football Association, winning a premiership in 1895, before being part of the inaugural Fitzroy side in the VFL. He played in their 1898 and 1899 VFL premierships. Aside from being one of the best afield in the 1899 Grand Final, he also won Fitzroy's best and fairest award that year.

His brother, Con, also played with Fitzroy in the VFA and was later an administrator for Fitzroy and the VFL.

"Old Boy's" Champion Player of 1899
At the end of the 1899 season, in the process of naming his own "champion player", the football correspondent for The Argus ("Old Boy"), selected a team of the best players of the 1899 VFL competition:
 Backs: Maurie Collins (Essendon), Bill Proudfoot (Collingwood), Peter Burns (Geelong)
 Halfbacks: Pat Hickey (Fitzroy), George Davidson (South Melbourne), Alf Wood (Melbourne)
  Centres: Fred Leach (Collingwood), Firth McCallum (Geelong), Harry Wright (Essendon)
 Wings: Charlie Pannam (Collingwood), Eddie Drohan (Fitzroy), Herb Howson (South Melbourne)
 Forwards: Bill Jackson (Essendon), Eddy James (Geelong), Charlie Colgan (South Melbourne)
 Ruck: Mick Pleass (South Melbourne), Frank Hailwood (Collingwood), Joe McShane (Geelong)
 Rovers: Dick Condon (Collingwood), Bill McSpeerin (Fitzroy), Teddy Rankin (Geelong).

From those he considered to be the three best players — that is, Condon, Hickey, and Pleass — "Old Boy" selected Pat Hickey as his "champion player" of the season.

Notes

External links 

1871 births
Fitzroy Football Club (VFA) players
Fitzroy Football Club players
Fitzroy Football Club Premiership players
Mitchell Medal winners
1946 deaths
Australian rules footballers from Victoria (Australia)
Two-time VFL/AFL Premiership players
People from Maryborough, Victoria